Arthur Stanton Eric Johnson (January 20, 1929 – July 3, 2019) was an American actor and comedian, who was best known for his work as a regular on television's Rowan & Martin's Laugh-In.

Biography

Early life
Johnson was born January 20, 1929, in Benton Harbor, Michigan, the son of Abraham Lincoln and Edythe Mackenzie (Goldberg/Golden) Johnson. His father was an attorney. Johnson graduated from Austin High School and received a bachelor's degree in radio journalism from University of Illinois at Urbana-Champaign in 1949, where he worked at the campus radio station and the University of Illinois Theater Guild with his brother Coslough "Cos" Johnson.

Following brief military service in Korea (he was discharged due to a duodenal ulcer he had suffered since childhood), he sought employment in Chicago advertising agencies but was unsuccessful and left for New York City to work for Viking Press. In early 1954, Johnson performed in several New York nightclubs, including Le Ruban Bleu and the Village Vanguard. His first job in show business came when he impulsively stepped into an audition line and was cast in Gentlemen Prefer Blondes. Johnson appeared in Ben Bagley's The Shoestring Revue, which opened off-Broadway on February 28, 1955, at the President Theater in New York.

Early television and film roles
Johnson appeared three times in the 1955–1956 CBS sitcom It's Always Jan, starring Janis Paige and Merry Anders. In 1956 a young Arte Johnson appeared in episode 22 Season 3 of the Make Room for Daddy in an episode called "Who can figure kids" where he sang and danced. In 1958 he joined the cast of the short-lived NBC sitcom Sally. On that program he played Bascomb Bleacher, Jr., the son of a co-owner of a department store, portrayed by Gale Gordon. He played Ariel Lavalerra in the 1960 film The Subterraneans, an adaptation of Jack Kerouac's 1958 novel of the same name. In 1960 and 1961, he appeared in three episodes of Jackie Cooper's military sitcom/drama series Hennesey, also on CBS. In Alfred Hitchcock Presents he played Mr. Bates in the episode "A Secret Life" (1962). He was cast in an episode of Frank Aletter's sitcom Bringing Up Buddy. He also appeared in an episode of The Twilight Zone titled "The Whole Truth" (1961).

Before his big breakthrough in Laugh-In, Johnson was cast for a guest role as Corporal Coogan in the anthology series GE True ("The Handmade Private," 1962). He played a bumbling navy cameraman on an episode of McHale's Navy in the first season and The Andy Griffith Show as a hotel clerk in the episode "Andy and Barney in the Big City" (also 1962). He was a member of the regular cast of the 1962–1963 situation comedy Don't Call Me Charlie!, portraying Corporal Lefkowitz. Johnson appeared in a comedic role as Charlie, a boom-microphone operator who demonstrates to Jack Benny how to tell a joke properly, on The Jack Benny Program that aired on October 2, 1964. The joke performed in the sketch was the "ugly baby" story, later associated with Flip Wilson. He made a guest appearance on ABC's sitcom, Bewitched as Samantha's (Elizabeth Montgomery) Cousin Edgar in the final episode of the first season, airing on June 2, 1965. Also in 1965, Johnson played a rare dramatic supporting role in the film The Third Day as Lester Aldrich, who turns out to be the downtrodden husband of the sleazy nymphomaniac Holly.

Johnson appeared in one of the final episodes of ABC's The Donna Reed Show in 1966. He was cast in the satirical James Coburn film The President's Analyst (1967), in which he gave a comically chilling performance as a federal agent with a blindly obedient "orders are orders" mentality. He appeared in the Season 3 episode of Lost in Space titled "Princess of Space" (1968). Johnson also starred in an episode of Rod Serling's Night Gallery titled "The Flip-Side of Satan" (1971).

Laugh-In
Johnson is best known for his work on Rowan & Martin's Laugh-In from 1968 to 1973, on which he played many characters, including "Wolfgang," a cigarette-smoking German soldier oblivious to the fact that World War II was long over, as he skulked while hidden behind a potted plant. He would then invariably comment on a preceding gag with the catchphrase "Very interesting ...," which Johnson claimed was inspired by a Nazi character who spoke the line during an interrogation scene in the film Desperate Journey (1942). Often toward the show's close, he (as the German) would offer words of affection to "Lucy and Gary" (Lucille Ball and her second husband Gary Morton). The Lucy Show and later Here's Lucy on CBS were in direct competition with NBC's Laugh-In on Monday night. Johnson reprised the role briefly on Sesame Street in the early 1970s, and while voicing the Nazi-inspired character Virman Vundabar on an episode of Justice League Unlimited.

His other prominent Laugh-In character was "Tyrone F. Horneigh" (pronounced "horn-eye," a "clean" variant of the vulgar term "horny"), the white-haired, trench coat-wearing "dirty old man" who repeatedly sought to seduce "Gladys Ormphby," (Ruth Buzzi's brown-clad "spinster" character) on a park bench. Tyrone would enter the scene, muttering a song (usually "In the Merry, Merry Month of May"), and, spying Gladys on the bench, would sit next to her. He would ask her a question, and regardless of the answer, turn it into a double entendre. She would then start hitting him with her purse and he would fall off the bench, sometimes with a plea for help.

To boost ratings in the third season, Tyrone successfully courted Gladys which led to an on-air wedding on the March 16, 1970, episode during the spring ratings sweep. Tiny Tim played best man, with Carol Channing as the bridesmaid, and Henry Gibson officiating. Alas, both bride-to-be and groom-to-be walk out of the church just before the wedding vows are spoken.

Years after Laugh-In ended, the two characters were the subject of an animated Saturday-morning children's show, Baggy Pants and the Nitwits, with Tyrone as a helpful, muttering "superhero."

Johnson and his brother Coslough earned Emmy Awards while working on Laugh-In.

Later work
Johnson guest-starred in two episodes of The Partridge Family ("My Heart Belongs to a Two Car Garage" and "For Whom the Bell Tolls... and Tolls... and Tolls") and the situation comedy A Touch of Grace (1973). He appeared in the first season of the Detroit-produced children's show Hot Fudge (1974) and, for one week, as a celebrity guest panelist on the game show Match Game. From 1976 to 1980, Johnson was a regular celebrity guest judge on The Gong Show.

In 1976, Johnson voiced the animated cartoon character Misterjaw, a blue, German-accented shark (with a bow tie and top hat), who liked to leap out of the water and shout "YEEEEotcha!" ("Gotcha!") at unsuspecting folks on The Pink Panther Laugh-and-a-Half Hour-and-a-Half Show. He also voiced the character "Rhubarb" on The Houndcats and appeared as a guest on Canadian TV show Celebrity Cooks (1976) with host Bruno Gerussi. Johnson appeared on an episode of the NBC daytime version of Wheel of Fortune in September 1977 as a substitute letter-turner, both to fill in for an injured Susan Stafford, and to promote his short-lived NBC game show Knockout, which aired through early 1978. Instead of being introduced by the show's announcer, he would start the show with a small monologue, then the announcer would introduce the day's contestants. He was cast as Renfield, the comic sidekick of George Hamilton's Dracula in the film Love at First Bite (1979) and appeared in the all-star television disaster movie Condominium (1980). He voiced "Weerd" in The 13 Ghosts of Scooby-Doo (1985), and played a disgruntled employee denied severance pay in an episode of Airwolf. He also voiced several other characters: Dr. Ludwig Von Strangebuck and Count Ray on two episodes of DuckTales; Devil Smurf on The Smurfs; Top Cat and Lou on Yo Yogi!; and Newt on Animaniacs. Johnson guest-starred in the Murder, She Wrote episode "No Laughing Murder" (1987). He also appeared in an episode of Night Court (1990). From 1991 to 1992, Johnson appeared in multiple episodes of General Hospital as Finian O'Toole. He played the old laboratory head of a team of scientists working on a serum of youth in Second Chance (1996).

He performed more than 80 audiobook readings, including Gary Shteyngart's Absurdistan (2006) and Carl Hiaasen's Bad Monkey. He appeared in the Justice League Unlimited episode "The Ties That Bind" (2005) as the voice of Virman Vundabar.

Johnson retired from acting in 2006.

Personal life
Johnson lived in Southern California with his wife, Gisela. He was a non-Hodgkin's lymphoma survivor, having been diagnosed and successfully treated in 1997. Johnson died on July 3, 2019, after being ill for three years with bladder and prostate cancer. He was 90. His ashes were scattered off Hawaii. Gisela Johnson survives him.

Filmography

Film

Television

References

External links

1929 births
2019 deaths
American game show hosts
American male comedians
American male film actors
American male television actors
20th-century American comedians
21st-century American comedians
American sketch comedians
American male voice actors
American military personnel of the Korean War
Comedians from California
Comedians from New York City
Deaths from bladder cancer
Deaths from cancer in California
Deaths from prostate cancer
Male actors from Los Angeles
Male actors from Michigan
Male actors from New York City
Military personnel from Michigan
People from Benton Harbor, Michigan
Primetime Emmy Award winners
United States Army personnel
United States Army personnel of the Korean War
United States Army soldiers
University of Illinois Urbana-Champaign College of Media alumni